The Israeli Embassy in Berlin is the headquarters of the diplomatic mission of Israel in Germany. It is located in the Berlin district of Schmargendorf at Auguste-Viktoria-Straße 74. Since August 29, 2017, the Israeli ambassador to Germany is Jeremy Issacharoff.

History 
There have been diplomatic relations between the state of Israel and West Germany since 1965. The first embassy, opened on August 24, 1965, was located in Cologne's Ehrenfeld district.  The following year, the embassy was moved to the Bad Godesberg district of Bonn.  With the relocation of the German seat of government after unification, the Israeli embassy was moved in August 1999 from Bonn to Berlin. Until then there had been an Israeli Consulate-General at Schinkelstraße 10 in the Grunewald district of West Berlin.

The current embassy building was built in the period 1999-2001. It was designed by Israeli architect Orit Willenberg-Giladi. She is the daughter of the late Samuel Willenberg, the last known survivor of the August 1943 Treblinka revolt, and his wife Ada. In 2013 she was selected to design the Holocaust education center planned for the former site of Treblinka extermination camp.)

Ambassadors in Germany

See also 
 Germany–Israel relations

References

External links 
 https://embassies.gov.il/berlin/Pages/default.aspx
 https://mfa.gov.il/MFA/AboutTheMinistry/Israeli%20ambassadors/Pages/Germany.aspx

Diplomatic missions of Israel
Diplomatic missions in Berlin
Germany–Israel relations